Elachista kakamegensis is a moth of the family Elachistidae that is endemic to Kenya.

The wingspan is about 5.3 mm for males and 6.8 mm for females. The forewings are blackish brown with silvery spots. The fringe line is brownish black, but the bases of the fringe line scales are whitish. There is a group of raised brownish black scales forming an irregular patch in the lower corner of the wing base. The hindwings and fringe are brown grey.

Etymology
The species name refers to Kakamega, the type locality.

References

kakamegensis
Moths described in 2009
Endemic moths of Kenya
Moths of Africa